Public spaces protection orders (PSPOs) are orders under the Anti-Social Behaviour, Crime and Policing Act 2014 which ban specific acts in a designated geographical area in England and Wales as set out in the act. They replace the earlier designated public place orders, gating orders and dog control orders.

Application 
PSPOs are intended to prevent specific acts which would not otherwise be criminal offences. They have been criticised as restricting freedoms and having a disproportionately severe effect on people below the poverty line. 

, there were 388 active PSPOs in Wales alone. Research by The Manifesto Club found a 420% increase in PSPO fines from 2016 to 2018. In 2018 there were 9,930 fixed penalty notices issued, 60% of which were from four councils: Peterborough, Bedford, Hillingdon and Waltham Forest. These four councils use private contractors to issue the fines.

Challenging PSPOs 
PSPOs can be challenged within six weeks of the order being issured on the grounds that the local authority does not have the power to issue the order, of that the legislation related to PSPOs has not been followed. The challenge must be made by a person who lives in the area or regularly visits it or, alternatively, a challenge can be made by any person charged with this offence. PSPOs must be renewed every three years. PSPOs have also been challenged through judicial review.

A PSPO placing restrictions on dog-walking was challenged a PSPO via judicial review issued in Richmond upon Thames resulting in orders related to causing annoyanced and damage to council property being removed. This affirmed the principle that PSPOs are intended to target antisocial rather than annoying behaviours.

Government guidance 
The issue of PSPOs is covered by legislation. The Home Office issues guidance for their use. In the case of limiting the walking of dogs councils are encouraged to publish lists of alternative dog walking locations and should consider whether such alternatives exist. Councils are advised that it is important to not restrict sociability in public places, and that a broad range of the public should be free to gather, talk and play games.

Examples of use of PSPO powers 
PSPOs have been introduced to apply to a wide variety of issues.

Examples include:
Salford City Council introduced a PSPO covering Salford Quays, which bans acts including using foul and abusive language. This has been interpreted as a response to football fans.
Royal Borough of Kensington and Chelsea introduced a PSPO "to address the excessive level of noise nuisance, annoyance, danger or risk or harm or injury caused by motor vehicles to members of the public" in Knightsbridge.
 Peterborough City Council introduced a PSPO to ban littering, spitting and cycling in specific roads in the centre of Peterborough.
 Kettering Borough Council enacted a curfew banning individuals under 18 from going outside alone between 11pm and 6am.
 In 2022, Redbridge Council used a PSPO to fine a man for sexual harassment, in the first example of such a use of the PSPO powers.
 An abortion buffer zones that banned protest and praying around a clinic providing abortion services was created using PSPOs in Birmingham.

Proposals to use PSPOs to ban rough sleeping 
In 2015, Hackney Council attempted to introduce a PSPO which would have banned rough sleeping. A similar ban was proposed in Newport. The Home Office guidance for PSPOs states that PSPOs should not be used to prevent  homelessness and rough sleeping.

References

See also 
 Byelaw

English criminal law